Fabien Lemoine (born 16 March 1987) is a French professional footballer who plays as a midfielder for  club Versailles.

Club career
Lemoine made his professional league debut for Rennes on 13 January 2008, he made a total of 18 league appearances during his first season. Lemoine joined Saint-Étienne in 2011 and remained at the club for six years. In 2017, Lemoine joined Ligue 2 club Lorient. The club was promoted to top-flight Ligue 1 for the 2020-2021 season.

Lemoine left Lorient on 26 August 2022, one of four players to do so that day, alongside Houboulang Mendes, Jérôme Hergault and Jérémy Morel. In September 2022 he signed for Versailles.

Honours
Saint-Étienne
French League Cup: 2012–13

References

External links

 

1987 births
Living people
People from Fougères
Sportspeople from Ille-et-Vilaine
Association football midfielders
French footballers
France under-21 international footballers
Stade Rennais F.C. players
AS Saint-Étienne players
FC Lorient players
Ligue 1 players
Ligue 2 players
Footballers from Brittany
FC Versailles 78 players